Town Challenge Cup was a rowing event for men's club fours at the annual Henley Royal Regatta on the River Thames at Henley-on-Thames in England.

The event ran from 1839 until 1883. The trophy which was awarded during the duration of the event is now used by a different regatta known as the Henley Town and Visitors Regatta. It is awarded for the Regatta’s highest-ranking fours event but today has no connection to the Henley Royal Regatta.

Winners

References

Events at Henley Royal Regatta
Rowing trophies and awards